Lema trivittata, known generally as the three-lined lema beetle or three-lined potato beetle, is a species of leaf beetle in the family Chrysomelidae. It is found in Central America and North America. It is an introduced species in Australia

Subspecies
These two subspecies belong to the species Lema trivittata:
 Lema trivittata medionota Schaeffer, 1933
 Lema trivittata trivittata Say, 1824

Similar species 
L. trivittata resembles and is closely related to Lema daturaphila and Lema bilineata.

References

Further reading

External links

 

Criocerinae
Articles created by Qbugbot
Beetles described in 1909